The northwestern deer mouse or Keen's mouse (Peromyscus keeni) is a species of rodent in the family Cricetidae. It is found in British Columbia in Canada and in Alaska and Washington in the United States. It was named after the Rev. John Henry Keen in 1894.

References

Musser, G. G. and M. D. Carleton. 2005. Superfamily Muroidea. pp. 894–1531 in Mammal Species of the World a Taxonomic and Geographic Reference. D. E. Wilson and D. M. Reeder eds. Johns Hopkins University Press, Baltimore.
Peromyscus keeni, Wilson and Reeder's Mammal Species of the World (Don E. Wilson & DeeAnn M. Reeder (editors). 2005. Mammal Species of the World. A Taxonomic and Geographic Reference. 3rd ed.)

Hanley, Thomas A., and Jeffrey C. Barnard. “Spatial Variation in Population Dynamics of Sitka Mice in Floodplain Forests.” Journal of Mammalogy, vol. 80, no. 3, 1999, pp. 866–879. JSTOR, www.jstor.org/stable/1383255.

Peromyscus
Rodents of North America
Mammals of Canada
Mammals of the United States
Fauna of Alaska
Least concern biota of North America
Least concern biota of the United States
Mammals described in 1894
Taxonomy articles created by Polbot